Heinrich Mathias Ernst Campendonk (3 November 1889 - 9 May 1957) was a painter and graphic designer born in Germany who became a naturalized Dutch citizen.

Life
Campendonk was born in Krefeld,  North Rhine-Westphalia, Germany. He was the son of a textile merchant, and served a textile apprenticeship until 1905. From 1905 to 1909, he received artistic education from Johan Thorn Prikker at the Handwerker- und Kunstgewerbeschule, a progressive school for arts and crafts.

He was a member of the Der Blaue Reiter group from 1911 to 1912. When the Nazi regime came to power in 1933, he was among the many modernists condemned as degenerate artists, and prohibited from exhibiting. He moved to the Netherlands, where he spent the rest of his life working at the Rijksakademie in Amsterdam, first teaching Decorative Art, printmaking and stained-glass, then as the Academy Director. He died as a naturalized Dutchman on 9 May 1957 in Amsterdam.

Literature
 Gisela Geiger: Heinrich Campendonk. The Great Masters of Art, Hirmer Publishers, Munich 2022,

See also
 List of German painters

References

External links

 Works of Heinrich Campendonk in the Yale Digital Commons Collection

1889 births
1957 deaths
20th-century German painters
20th-century German male artists
German male painters
Modern painters
German Expressionist painters
People from Krefeld
German emigrants to the Netherlands